

Squad

As of 2009-02-02

Transfers

January 2009

In:

Out:

Out on loan:

Summer 2008

In:

Out:

Out on loan:

Appearances and goals

Correct as of 17:19, 1 February 2009 (UTC) 

|}

Top scorers
Friendlies not included

Matches

Pre-season friendlies

Coppa Italia

Serie A

References

Atalanta B.C. seasons
Atalanta